The voting rights of Indigenous Australians became an issue from the mid-19th century, when responsible government was being granted to Britain's Australian colonies, and suffrage qualifications were being debated. The resolution of universal rights progressed into the mid-20th century.

Indigenous Australians, that is Aboriginal Australian and Torres Strait Islander peoples, began to acquire voting rights along with other adults living in the Australian colonies from the late-19th century. Other than in Queensland and Western Australia, Indigenous men acquired the vote alongside their non-Indigenous counterparts in the Australian colonies. In South Australia, Indigenous women also acquired the vote from 1895 onward.

Following Australian Federation in 1901, the Commonwealth Franchise Act 1902 restricted Aboriginal voting rights in federal elections. For a time Aboriginal people could vote in some states and not in others, though from 1949, Aboriginal people could vote if they were or had been servicemen. In 1962, the Menzies government amended the Commonwealth Electoral Act 1918 to enable all Indigenous Australians to enrol to vote in Australian federal elections. In 1965, Queensland became the last state to remove restrictions on Indigenous voting in state elections, and as a consequence all Indigenous Australians in all states and territories had equal voting rights at all levels of government.

Many restrictions on voting rights only applied to some people that would, today, be considered Indigenous. Specifically, only people of full Indigenous ancestry or of mixed race "in whom the aboriginal blood preponderates" were limited through the Franchise Act. It did not apply to Indigenous people of mixed race that were, to use the language of the time, "half-caste" or less. In practice, some local electoral officials may have denied enrolment to a broader range of Indigenous people than those formally excluded.

Indigenous voting history 
Prior to the Commonwealth of Australia Constitution Act 1900 (UK), each colony of Australia could pass its own legislation concerning the enfranchisement of indigenous Australians. Differences between the colonies meant Indigenous Australians' right to vote depended on the area in which they resided.

Voting was reformed by the Constitution Act, which united the states of New South Wales, Victoria, South Australia, Tasmania, Western Australia and Queensland. The Constitution established the Commonwealth of Australia, with the previously self-governing colonies federated to establish the Commonwealth. Indigenous Australians were granted the universal right to vote in federal elections in 1962 under the Commonwealth Electoral Act 1962.

Timeline of Indigenous Australians' right to vote

Colonial Indigenous franchise

New South Wales, Victoria, South Australia and Tasmania
When the colonial constitutions were framed, mostly in the 1850s—New South Wales (1858), Victoria (1857), South Australia (1858) and Tasmania (1896)—voting rights were granted to all male British subjects over the age of 21. It was acknowledged that Indigenous people were British subjects under the English common law and were entitled to the rights of that status. Accordingly, Indigenous men were not specifically denied the right to vote. 
However, few Aboriginals were aware of their rights, Aboriginals were not encouraged to enroll to vote and very few participated in elections.

Some Aboriginal people are known to have voted. For example, Point McLeay, a mission station near the mouth of the Murray River, in South Australia, got a polling station in the 1890s and Aboriginal men and women voted there in South Australian elections.

Queensland
Queensland gained self-government in 1859, extending voting rights in 1872 to include all British male subjects over the age of 21. Aboriginals were excluded from voting in Queensland in 1885, and the disqualification was in place until 1965.

Western Australia
Western Australia gained self-government in 1890. In 1893 voting rights were extended to include all British male subjects over the age of 21, with the exclusion of Aboriginal males. Aboriginals were disqualified for the vote in Western Australia until 1962.

Commonwealth franchise in the early 20th century

First Commonwealth election
Section 41 of the Australian Constitution appears to give the right to vote in federal elections to those who have the right to vote in state elections. The first election for the Commonwealth Parliament in 1901 was based on the electoral laws at that time of the six colonies, so that those who had the right to vote and to stand for Parliament at state level had the same rights for that election. Aboriginal men had at least a theoretical vote for that election in all States except Queensland and Western Australia. Aboriginal women had the vote in South Australia.

Some Aboriginal people voted for the first Commonwealth Parliament; for example, the mission station of Point McLeay, in South Australia, had a polling station since the 1890s and Aboriginal men and women voted there in 1901.

Legislative restrictions
The Commonwealth Franchise Act 1902 withdrew any Aboriginal voting rights for federal elections, providing that "No aboriginal native of Australia ... shall be entitled to have his name placed on an Electoral Roll unless so entitled under section forty-one of the Constitution". Section forty-one of the Constitution provided that all those entitled to vote in state elections under the state franchise could vote in Commonwealth elections. It is not clear whether that section was intended to be an ongoing provision, or only an interim measure for State electors enrolled at the time of Federation. The first Permanent Head of the Attorney-General's Department, Robert Garran, gave it the second, narrower, interpretation. The Act also denied the vote to native people of Asia, Africa and the Pacific Islands except New Zealand.

Garran's interpretation of section 41 was challenged in 1924 by Mitta Bullosh, a Melbourne resident Indian who had been accepted as a voter by Victoria but rejected by the Commonwealth. He won his case in the District Court, and the Commonwealth government later withdrew a High Court challenge to the judge's ruling. The effect of the 1924 finding was that indigenous Australians in all states except Queensland and Western Australia could vote in federal polls.

Expansion to full Aboriginal franchise

Campaigns for indigenous civil rights in Australia gathered momentum from the 1930s. In 1938, with the participation of leading Indigenous activists like Douglas Nicholls, the Australian Aborigines' League and the Aborigines Progressive Association organised a protest "Day of Mourning" to mark the 150th anniversary of the arrival of the First Fleet of British settlers in Australia and launched a campaign for full civil rights for all Aboriginal peoples.

In 1949, the Commonwealth Electoral Act 1949 reversed Garran's interpretation of section 41 and confirmed that all those who could vote in their states could vote in federal elections. This gave the right to vote to Aboriginal people in all states except Queensland and Western Australia. Also, those who had served in the military were expressly entitled to vote.

In the 1960s, influenced by the strong civil rights movements in the United States and South Africa, many changes in Aboriginal peoples' rights and treatment followed, including removal of restrictions on voting rights. In 1962, the Menzies government amended the Commonwealth Electoral Act to give Indigenous people the right to enrol and vote in Commonwealth elections irrespective of their voting rights at the state level. If they were enrolled, it was compulsory for them to vote as per non-Indigenous citizens. However, enrolment itself was not compulsory. Western Australia gave Indigenous citizens the vote in the State in the same year, and Queensland followed in 1965.

In 1983, the Electoral Act was amended, to remove optional enrolment for Indigenous citizens, and removing any differentiation or distinction based on race in the Australian electoral system.

See also 
 Australian Aborigines' League
 Maori voting rights in Australia
 Self-determination of Australian Aborigines
 Suffrage in Australia

References

Readings 
 Pat Stretton and Christine Finnimore, "Black Fellow Citizens: Aborigines and the commonwealth Franchise", Australian Historical Studies, vol. 25, no. 101, 1993, pp. 521–35

External links 
 Electoral Milestones / Timetable for Indigenous Australians

Australian constitutional law
History of Indigenous Australians
Indigenous Australian politics
Election law
Elections in Australia